Hayastan Jan  is an Armenian television program hosted by Armenian presenter-songwriter Avet Barseghyan. The show shares its name with the song "Hayastan Jan" by Armenian singer Iveta Mukuchyan, the theme music of the show. The series premiered on Armenia 1 on September 23, 2017, and the opening was made by Mukuchyan singing her single. The series aired on Sundays at 9:00. The show concluded on 27 January 2018 overall having sixteen episodes.

Episodes

Episode 1 
The episode aired on September 23, 2017.

Episode 2 
The episode aired on September 30, 2017.

Episode 3 
The episode aired on October 7, 2017.

Episode 4 
The episode aired on October 14, 2017.

Episode 5 
The episode aired on October 21, 2017.

Episode 6 
The episode aired on October 28, 2017.

References

External links

 

Armenian-language television shows
Public Television Company of Armenia original programming
Republic of Artsakh
Armenian television game shows
2010s Armenian television series
2010s game shows
Television game shows with incorrect disambiguation